Breeze Hill School was a mixed-sex comprehensive secondary school for 11- to 16-year-olds in Oldham, Greater Manchester, England. It was a specialist Humanities College, and served over 750 students. Bernard Phillips was the last headteacher of Breeze Hill School before it merged with neighbouring Counthill School to form the Waterhead Academy. Since the school lay in the heart of Oldham's Pakistani Asian community, the students were predominantly Asian.

Campus 
The Breeze Hill School campus contained two main teaching blocks. The Year 7 Base was for new arrivals, and was created to ease the transition between primary and secondary school. The main teaching block served students from Year 8 onwards. Breeze Hill had intensive playing fields and an Astro-turf pitch, used for various sports both by students from the school and by the local community.

History 
In May 2001, a racially motivated attack outside Breeze Hill School began a series of events
that escalated into a five-day period of rioting known as the Oldham Riots.

On 31 August 2010, Breeze Hill School and Counthill School merged to become the Waterhead Academy. The campus was renamed Roxbury Campus until the academy moved to a third location in November 2012.

Notable alumni
John Lees (musician), founder of English rock band Barclay James Harvest
Munira Mirza, Director of Number 10 Policy Unit

References

External links
Breeze Hill School website
Waterhead Academy website

Defunct schools in the Metropolitan Borough of Oldham
Educational institutions established in 1960
1960 establishments in England
Educational institutions disestablished in 2010
2010 disestablishments in England
Schools in Oldham